The 1904–05 season was the second competitive season in the history of Plymouth Argyle Football Club.

Southern League

Summary

Results

Standings

Western League

Summary

Results

Standings

FA Cup

Summary

Results

References
General

Specific

External links
Plymouth Argyle F.C. official website
Plymouth Argyle F.C. archive

1904-05
English football clubs 1904–05 season